The 2018 Catalan motorcycle Grand Prix was the seventh round of the 2018 Grand Prix motorcycle racing season. It was held at the Circuit de Barcelona-Catalunya in Montmeló on 17 June 2018.

Classification

MotoGP

Moto2

Moto3

 Niccolò Antonelli suffered a dislocated shoulder in crash during practice and was declared unfit to start the race.

Championship standings after the race

MotoGP

Moto2

Moto3

Notes

References

Catalan
Catalan motorcycle Grand Prix
motorcycle
Catalan motorcycle Grand Prix
Catalan motorcycle Grand Prix